Wiesław Glos (12 September 1936 – 6 January 2021) was a Polish fencer. He competed at the 1960 and 1964 Summer Olympics.

References

External links
 

1936 births
2021 deaths
Polish male fencers
Olympic fencers of Poland
Fencers at the 1960 Summer Olympics
Fencers at the 1964 Summer Olympics
Sportspeople from Kraków